Rovshan Janiyev (27 January 1975 – 18 August 2016), also known as Rovshan Lankaransky, was a Azerbaijani gangster.

Early life
When Janiyev was 17 years old, his father, a policeman, was murdered by local gangsters whom he was investigating. In 1996 during the court hearing, upon hearing the accused threatening his family, Janiyev pulled out a gun and killed him in court. He was sentenced to two years in prison.

Criminal acts
Later in 2000, he shot a prominent Baku crime boss in broad daylight and was subsequently beaten so severely that he developed a mental illness. Taking this into account, the court released him after just a few months imprisonment. Fearing for his life, Janiyev fled from Azerbaijan to Moscow where he grew more and more powerful within the underworld and eventually controlled all the ethnic Azerbaijani gangs in Moscow, running protection rackets and drug trafficking.

Eventually competition over territory grew with the Caucasian gangs led by Aslan Usoyan. In 2010 an attempt was made on Usoyan's life and it has been theorized that Janiyev, who had been arrested trying to enter Ukraine shortly afterwards (where he already controlled some criminal business and had been previously granted refugee status), had a major part in its planning and execution.

In January 2013, after Usoyan's assassination, Janiyev, along with Tariel Oniani, was regarded as a primary suspect. Shortly afterwards Astamur Guliya, an Abkhaz gangster and ally of Janiyev, was gunned down in Sukhumi. Janiyev himself was reported killed in Istanbul on 6 February,  but this claim was denied by his brother Emil, who claimed he was alive and well in the United Arab Emirates.

In 2013, Italian law enforcement authorities reported Janiyev's presence in the country to Interpol. In a law enforcement report, Janiyev was accused of being engaged in organized crime, bribery, money laundering and forgery of documents.

On 17 August 2016 Janiyev was assassinated in Istanbul, Turkey, after returning from a trip to Dubai. Janiyev was shot in his luxury Range Rover car, which bore an Azerbaijani license plate, in the Beşiktaş district. Janiyev's local driver was killed on the spot. Janiyev himself was transported to Şişli Etfal hospital and died of his wounds there. Janiyev's corpse was flown to Azerbaijan via a private plane belonging to Azerbaijani billionaire Mübariz Mansimov. Reports emerged that more than 25,000 people came to mourn him at the airport. Yeni Musavat columnist Ilgar Kamil explained the phenomenon of glorifying Janiyev by the pratfall effect which would allow people to excuse Janiyev's criminal past because he had avenged his father "in due manner" as a teenager. Another reason, according to Kamil, is the tendency to subconsciously admire someone who does what others would like to do but do not dare to.

References

1975 births
2016 deaths
Azerbaijani gangsters
Murdered gangsters
Thieves in law
People from Lankaran